Horatio Alger Jr. published about 100 poems and odes, most written by 1875. In 1853–54, he published short stories with Gleason's Pictorial Drawing-Room Companion and The Flag of Our Nation. Other Gleason publications printed about 100 stories before he began writing for The Student and Schoolmate.

Alger had many publishers over the decades. His first was A. K. Loring of Boston, and when Loring declared bankruptcy in 1881, Porter & Coates became his second and Henry T. Coates and Company his third. Other publishers include G. W. Carleton, J. S. Oglivie, John Anderson who published the biographies, A. L. Burt, Frank Munsey, Penn Publishing, and Street & Smith. M. A. Donahue and the New York Book Company published inexpensive paperback reprints by the thousands. It is believed there were at least 60 publishers releasing Alger.

References